The Martin University Hospital (abbreviated to UNM) is a Slovak public university hospital located in the Martin municipality, in the county of Zilina, north-east of the Slovak capital Bratislava. It is a teaching hospital and it is the main university hospital affiliated with the Jessenius School of Medicine. The hospital has over 1,700 employees. Martin University Hospital has 900 beds in total including all sectors. 
The current director of the hospital is Dr. Dušan Krkoška, M.D., PhD., MBA.

History 
Long known for its curative thermal springs, the region of Turiec has a history as a destination for people with various illnesses. King Ladislaus IV of Hungary wrote of its healing effects in 1281 as did King Sigismund of Luxembourg in 1423. In 1532 Johannes Barbierus of Mosovce became the first permanent doctor to settle here, and later in 1680 the Jesuits set up a monastic pharmacy at the site.

1888-1945: War and epidemics
The present hospital, however, was not completed until 1888; after a lengthy process, operations did not commence until 1889. The hospital suffered from chronic lack of skilled doctors and beds were scarce, yet within a few years over 200 patients per year were treated, most with lung and intestinal disorders. In 1892 a cholera epidemic struck the region, this along with recurrent outbreaks of tuberculosis made sure that new wards for patients with infectious diseases were required to be built.

During World War I Martin Hospital was converted to an auxiliary army hospital and used for treating wounded soldiers. As the war progressed and the number of patients increased, the hospital undertook rapid expansion to accommodate them. After the war, with increasing population the hospital again needed to expand, and in 1923 a new surgical building was constructed. However, as beds were still insufficient, the authorities resorted to buying adjacent private residences to alleviate the shortage. In 1934 the Department of Gynecology was completed.

The World War II years again saw the hospital being used as a military reserve hospital, but also the construction of both pediatric and otolaryngology wards, and despite having to dismiss all Czech and Jewish doctors it remained in service throughout the war years.

1945-present
As a result of the war the hospital in Martin had suffered serious damage. The consequences of fighting had taken its toll and buildings were in need of significant structural repair. It had also become necessary to supplement the lack of medical and technical material. Dr. Jàn Longauer became the new manager and things started to improve. A new generation of doctors arrived who contributed to the growth of professional and social prestige. One of those doctors was Dr. Vladimir Galanda who in Turiec developed a high level of medical care for children. Another was the father of modern Czechoslovak cardiac surgery Pavol Steiner, who performed in Martin the first open cardiac surgery in Slovakia. By the 1960s it had become a teaching hospital serving medical students from the Jessenius School of Medicine, also located in Martin, and new departments were added continuously.

In 1992 several units were created including a separate Neonatal Unit, a Department of tropical disease, a Department of Gastroenterology, a Department of Parasitology and Department of Clinical Oncology. A year later, the ear-nose-throat clinic changed its name to the Department of Otorhinolaryngology as it was no longer part of the Surgical Clinic Department of Pediatric Surgery and Department of Neurosurgery. The Skin Clinic was renamed the Department of Dermatology and the Women's Clinic of Gynaecology and Obstetrics. The Anaesthesiology and Resuscitation Department became the Department of Anesthesiology and Intensive Care Medicine in 1996.

In early 2002, changes occurred in the teaching of basic medicine. Centers for teaching medical students in pediatric surgery, sports medicine, neonatal, and the Department of Clinical Biochemistry became separate clinics. Over the years the hospital has undergone thorough modernization including a new surgical department completed in 2011. In September 2012 the Clinic of Ophthalmology performed Slovakia's first intra-ocular lens implantation, curing two patients with cataracts. In July 2010, the hospital changed its name from Martin Faculty Hospital to its current name, Martin University Hospital.

Specialties 

Department of Children and Adolescents
Center for children with diabetes mellitus
Center for children with growth hormone deficiency

Department of Dermatology
Center for pemphigoid autoimmune diseases in dermatology
Center for biological treatment of psoriasis and dermatoses

Department of Internal Medicine I
Center for Invasive and Interventional Cardiology,
Martin University Hospital Transplantation Center

Department of Medicine II
Center for diagnosis and treatment of resistant peptic ulcers and gastrointestinal neuroendocrine tumors
Center for indication and application of biological treatment in gastroenterology

Department of Infectology and Travel Medicine
Center for Tropical Diseases and travel medicine
Center for diagnosis and treatment of chronic viral hepatitis
Center for follow-up and treatment of HIV positive people

Department of Gynecology and Obstetrics
Perinatology Center

Department of Hematology and Transfusion
National Center for hemostasis and thrombosis

Department of Pneumology and phtiseology
Center to provide long-term home oxygen therapy
Center for diagnosis and treatment of sleep related breathing disorders

Department of Pathology
Center for centralized diagnosis of rare tumors of GIT
Center for the detection of HER2 status in malignant tumors of epithelial origin
Center for diagnostic biopsy of hematopoietic diseases and lymphatic tissue
Center for diagnostic biopsy of skin diseases

Department of Neurology
Center for Cerebrovascular disease in Neurology
Center for Neuromuscular diseases in Neurology
Center for demyelinating diseases of the central nervous system

Ministry of Health Experts

Professor Peter Banovcin, MD., PhD., Paediatrics
Associate Professor  Julian Hamzik, MD. PhD., Thoracic Surgery
Professor Dušan Meško, MD., PhD., Sports medicine
Associate Professor Dalibor Murgas, MD., PhD., Paediatric surgery
Professor Juraj Pec, MD., PhD., Dermatovenerology

Professor Lukáš Plank, MD., PhD., Pathology
Professor Mirko Zibolen, MD., PhD., Neonatology
Associate Professor Ivan Rezňák, MD., PhD., Nuclear Medicine

Notable doctors

Pavol Steiner (1908–1969), Olympic water polo player, swimmer, and cardiac surgeon

See also
List of hospitals in Slovakia

References

External links 

Martin University Hospital

Hospital buildings completed in 1888
Hospitals in Slovakia
Medical education in Slovakia
Teaching hospitals
Hospitals established in 1889